R. M. Babu Murugavel is an Indian politician and a member of the 14th Tamil Nadu Legislative Assembly from the Arni constituency. He represented the Desiya Murpokku Dravidar Kazhagam party.

The elections of 2016 resulted in his constituency being won by S. Sevoor Ramachandran.

References 

Living people
Tamil Nadu MLAs 2011–2016
Desiya Murpokku Dravida Kazhagam politicians
Year of birth missing (living people)